Richmond County may refer to places:

Australia 
Richmond County, New South Wales, a cadastral division

Canada 
Richmond County, Nova Scotia

United Kingdom 
Richmondshire, the original Richmond County in Yorkshire, England

United States 
Richmond County, Georgia
Richmond County, New York, the Staten Island borough of New York City
Richmond County, North Carolina
Richmond County, Virginia

County name disambiguation pages